Binfield is a hamlet on the Isle of Wight near Newport. It primarily lies along the A3054 road, which runs from Newport to East Cowes and Ryde.

The primary site of interest in Binfield is Island Harbour Marina, with the remainder being a number of farms and houses, particularly those running along East Cowes Road.

Villages on the Isle of Wight